The Wushi Harbor is a harbor in Toucheng Township, Yilan County, Taiwan.

History
The harbor was inaugurated in 1826. It used to be the commercial hub for cargo ships entering and leaving the area during Qing Dynasty. In 19th century, there has been many sedimentation on the harbor seabed. With addition to the opening of Yilan Line railway, the harbor became less popular. After the year 2000, the Executive Yuan designated the harbor area as park and cultural zone.

Destinations
 Guishan Island

Architecture
The harbor features tourist information center, fish market etc. The Lanyang Museum is also located nearby the area.

Transportation
The harbor is accessible within walking distance north of Toucheng Station of Taiwan Railways. It is also accessible by bus from Taipei by taking Kuo-Kuang bus 1877 arriving in front of Wushi Port.

See also
 Transportation in Taiwan

References

1826 establishments in Taiwan
Ports and harbors of Yilan County, Taiwan
Transport infrastructure completed in 1826